Swaarangi is Pakistani crime drama film directed by Phida Hussain and produced by Mazhar Abbas under the production banner of Flipping Images Productions and Phida Hussain Productions. The film stars Resham, Ayub Khoso, Naveed Akbar, Waseem Manzoor, Hamza Mushtaq and Shahzaib Johar in lead roles.

The film was released by Footprint Entertainment on 11 September 2015 on limited screens in Pakistan.

Synopsis
Salma's husband, Jamal is not the easiest man to get along with, but for the sake of their children, she stays with him. Jamal is a heroin addict, dependent on Salma's instincts to protect her wedding vows so he can take advantage of her honorability to get his daily fix. He is lost without her, desperate to change however willing to sell his soul to the devil if need be. Although Salma is powerless to change his sick ways but she has to stand against the odds and struggle for everything she got. Zaryaab is the man who controls the illegal activities of the area. He is fully supported by the powerful syndicate head Saien. Swaarangi is an intertwined story about life, fate, sacrifice and survival.

Cast
 Resham as Salma
 Ayub Khoso as Saieen
 Hamza Mushtaq as Asad
 Waseem Manzoor as Zaryaab
 Zulfiqar Gullshahi as Inspector Akbar
 Naveed Akbar as Jamal
 Shahzaib Johar as Haris
 Aftab Nisar as Nawaz
 Hasnain as Saieen assistant
 Rehman Saieen's assistant

Music
The music of the film is composed by Sahir Ali Bagga and Mujtaba Ali Choni.

Release 
Earlier, the film was scheduled to release on 28 August 2015 but was delayed for a later release on 11 September.

See also 
 List of directorial debuts
 List of Pakistani films of 2015

References

External links
 
 
 Swaarangi trailer on Vimeo
 

2010s action war films
Pakistani action war films
Films shot in Turkey
Insurgency in Khyber Pakhtunkhwa fiction
2015 films
Films scored by Sahir Ali Bagga
Military of Pakistan in films
2010s Urdu-language films